Uttoxeter is a civil parish in the district of East Staffordshire, Staffordshire, England.  It contains 65 buildings that are recorded in the National Heritage List for England.  Of these, five are listed at Grade II*, the middle grade, and the others are at Grade II, the lowest grade.  The parish contains the market town of Uttoxeter and the immediate surrounding area.  Most of the listed buildings are houses and shops, the earliest of which are timber framed or have timber framed cores.  Also listed are churches, chapels and associated structures, public houses and hotels, public buildings, a bridge, parts of a school, almshouses, a Friends' meeting house, a milestone and mileposts, a marker stone, a conduit or market cross, a former animal pound, a cricket pavilion, and a war memorial.

For the listed buildings in the rural area around Uttoxeter, see Listed buildings in Uttoxeter Rural.


Key

Buildings

References

Citations

Sources

Lists of listed buildings in Staffordshire
Listed